Estola is a genus of longhorn beetles of the subfamily Lamiinae, containing the following species:

 Estola acrensis Galileo & Martins, 2009
 Estola acricula Bates, 1866
 Estola affinis Breuning, 1940
 Estola albicans Breuning, 1940
 Estola albocincta Melzer, 1932
 Estola albomarmorata Breuning, 1943
 Estola albosetosa Breuning, 1940
 Estola albosignata Breuning, 1940
 Estola albosparsa Thomson, 1858
 Estola albostictica Breuning, 1940
 Estola albovaria Breuning, 1940
 Estola alternata Breuning, 1940
 Estola annulata (Fabricius, 1801)
 Estola annulicornis Fisher, 1942
 Estola annulipes Breuning, 1940
 Estola assimilis Breuning, 1940
 Estola attenuata Fisher, 1926
 Estola basiflava Breuning, 1943
 Estola basimaculata Breuning, 1940
 Estola basinotata Bates, 1866
 Estola benjamini Breuning, 1940
 Estola boliviana Breuning, 1940
 Estola brunnea Thomson, 1868
 Estola brunneovariegata Breuning, 1940
 Estola brunnescens Breuning, 1940
 Estola cayennensis Breuning, 1940
 Estola cerdai Martins & Galileo, 2009
 Estola cinerea Breuning, 1940
 Estola columbiana Breuning, 1940
 Estola compacta Breuning, 1940
 Estola crassepunctata Breuning, 1940
 Estola cuneata Breuning, 1940
 Estola daidalea Martins & Galileo, 2002
 Estola densepunctata Breuning, 1940
 Estola dilloni Zayas, 1975
 Estola diversemaculata Breuning, 1943
 Estola flavescens Breuning, 1940
 Estola flavobasalis Breuning, 1940
 Estola flavolineata Breuning, 1950
 Estola flavomarmorata Breuning, 1942
 Estola flavostictica Breuning, 1940
 Estola fratercula Galileo & Martins, 1999
 Estola freyi Breuning, 1955
 Estola fuscodorsalis Breuning, 1940
 Estola fuscomarmorata Breuning, 1940
 Estola fuscopunctata Breuning, 1943
 Estola fuscostictica Breuning, 1940
 Estola griseostictica Breuning, 1940
 Estola grisescens Breuning, 1940
 Estola hirsuta (DeGeer, 1775)
 Estola hirsutella Aurivillius, 1922
 Estola hispida Lameere, 1893
 Estola ignobilis Bates, 1872
 Estola insularis Blair, 1933
 Estola kuscheli Barriga, Moore & Capeda, 2005
 Estola lata Fuchs, 1974
 Estola longeantennata Breuning, 1940
 Estola m-flava Breuning, 1940
 Estola marmorata Breuning, 1940
 Estola medionigra Breuning, 1940
 Estola microphthalma Breuning, 1942
 Estola minor Breuning, 1940
 Estola misella Bates, 1885
 Estola nebulosa Breuning, 1940
 Estola nigrescens Breuning, 1943
 Estola nigrodorsalis Martins & Galileo, 2009
 Estola nigropunctata Breuning, 1940
 Estola nigrosignata Breuning, 1940
 Estola nodicollis Breuning, 1940
 Estola obliquata Breuning, 1940
 Estola obliquelineata Breuning, 1940
 Estola obscura (Fabricius, 1792)
 Estola obscurella Monné & Giesbert, 1992
 Estola obscuroides Breuning, 1942
 Estola operosa Martins & Galileo, 2007
 Estola parvula Breuning, 1940
 Estola porcula Bates, 1866
 Estola retrospinosa Breuning, 1940
 Estola rogueti Chalumeau & Touroult, 2005
 Estola rufa Breuning, 1940
 Estola ruficeps Breuning, 1943
 Estola seriata Kirsch, 1875
 Estola similis Breuning, 1940
 Estola stramentosa Breuning, 1940
 Estola strandi Breuning, 1940
 Estola strandiella Breuning, 1942
 Estola subannulicornis Breuning, 1963
 Estola timbauba Martins & Galileo, 2006
 Estola trinidadensis Breuning, 1955
 Estola truncatella Bates, 1866
 Estola unicolor Fairmaire & Germain, 1859
 Estola varicornis Bates, 1866
 Estola variegata Bates, 1866
 Estola vittulata Bates, 1874
 Estola vulgaris Galileo & Martins, 1999

References

 
Desmiphorini